Tân Biên is a ward located in Biên Hòa city of Đồng Nai province, Vietnam. It has an area of about 6.1km2 and the population in 2018 was 36,037.

References

Bien Hoa